The 1994–95 Cruz Azul season was the 68th year in existence and 30th campaign consecutive playing in top flight division, also the club competed in Copa México.

Summary
In summertime, President Billy Alvarez reinforced the squad with Peruvian Defender Juan Reynoso, Forward Marcelo Delgado  and midfielder Marco Garces. The squad performance during the first half of the season was irrregular due to an unbalanced performance: a superb offensive line but a weak defensive guard. During the mid season the club replaced young Goalkeeper Oscar Perez with Argentine Norberto Scoponi also manager Enrique Meza was sacked  and Luis Fernando Tena was appointed for the second half of the season. The season is best remembered by the 91 goals registered by a powerful offensive line aimed by Julio Zamora assists and Hermosillo clinching another league topscorer title. In league the team finished 3rd in the league's overall table, defeating Pumas UNAM in quarterfinals with a late goal scored by Right back Defender Guadalupe Castañeda. 

Cruz Azul appeared in the playoffs. In the semi-finals they beat Club América (with whom they share Estadio Azteca) in the semi-finals.
Reaching the final for the first time since 1989 they drew Necaxa 1–1 in the first leg, but lost the second leg 0–2 for a 3–1 aggregate.

In the 1994–95 Copa México they were eliminated in the first round by second tier side Irapuato.

Squad

Transfers

Winter

Competitions

La Liga

League table

Group 1

Overall Table

Results by round

Matches

Quarter-finals

Aggregate tied 1-1. Cruz Azul advanced to semi-finals as best seeded team.

Semi-finals

Cruz Azul won 2–3 on aggregate.

Finals

Necaxa won 3–1 on aggregate.

Copa Mexico

First round

Irapuato won 5–3 on penalties.

Statistics

Players statistics

References 

1994–95 Mexican Primera División season
Cruz Azul seasons